Belgium is a federal state located in Western Europe, bordering the North Sea. Belgium shares borders with France (556 km), Germany (133 km), Luxembourg (130 km) and the Netherlands (478 km). Belgium is divided into three regions: Flanders, Wallonia and Brussels.

General information

Total renewable water resources: 18.3 cu km (2011)

Freshwater withdrawal (domestic/industrial/agricultural):
total: 6.22 cu km/yr (12%/88%/1%)
per capita: 589.8 cu m/yr (2007)

Natural hazards:
flooding is a threat in areas of reclaimed coastal land, protected from the sea by concrete dikes

Geography – note:
crossroads of Western Europe; majority of West European capitals within 1,000  km of Brussels which is the seat of both the EU and NATO

Longest Distances: 280 km SE-NW/ 222 km NE-SW

Area

By provinces, the area is distributed as such:
 Luxembourg: 
 Liège: 
 Hainaut: 
 Namur: 
 West Flanders: 
 East Flanders: 
 Antwerp: 
 Limburg: 
 Flemish Brabant: 
 Walloon Brabant: 

For the purpose of total area, the Brussels-Capital Region should also be included, though no longer a province since the Brabant was split. Belgium has also 3,462 square kilometres of sea territories in the North Sea. On 29 May 2000, 2,000 square meters were granted by the Netherlands to Belgium (a piece of land in Zelzate along the Ghent–Terneuzen Canal).

Compared to other countries, Belgium is 44% larger than Wales in the United Kingdom and about the size of Maryland in the United States. Belgium is actually used as an unusual unit of measurement in comparing country sizes.

In November 2016, Belgium and the Netherlands agreed to cede small, uninhabited parcels of land to reflect a change in course of the river Meuse (or Maas, in Dutch). The land swap is to take effect as of 2018.

Physical geography

Belgium has three main geographical regions: the coastal plain in the north-west, the central plateau, and the Ardennes uplands in the south-east. The coastal plain consists mainly of sand dunes and polders. Polders are areas of land, close to or below sea level that have been reclaimed from the sea, from which they are protected by dikes or, further inland, by fields that have been drained with canals. The second geographical region, the central plateau, lies further inland. This is a smooth, slowly rising area that has many fertile valleys and is irrigated by many waterways. Here one can also find rougher land, including caves and small gorges. The third geographical region, called the Ardennes, is more rugged than the first two. It is a thickly forested plateau, very rocky and not very good for farming, which extends into northern France and in Germany where it is named Eifel. This is where much of Belgium's wildlife can be found. Belgium's highest point, the Signal de Botrange is located in this region at only . Belgium has relatively few natural lakes and none of any great size.

Notable natural regions include the Ardennes, Campine and High Fens.

Rivers and lakes

All of Belgium is drained into the North Sea, except the municipality of Momignies (Macquenoise), which is drained by the river Oise into the English Channel. Three major rivers flow into the sea: the Scheldt (200 km in Belgium, 350 km in total), the Meuse (183 km in Belgium, 925 km in total) and the Yser (50 km in Belgium, 78 km in total). Other rivers are the Rupel, Senne, Sambre, Lesse, Ourthe, Lys and Dijle. The main lakes include the Lake Genval, Lake Bütgenbach, Lake Eau d'Heure, Lake Gileppe, Lake Eupen and Lake Robertville.

Artificial waterways
Belgium has also many artificial waterways or canals, among others the Brussels–Scheldt Maritime Canal, the Brussels–Charleroi Canal, the Canal du Centre and the Albert Canal in Antwerp.

Climate
Belgium usually has cool winters but temperatures as low as −16 °C (3 °F) have been registered and summers are comfortably warm but temperatures can occasionally rise as high as 30 °C (86 °F).

Mountain and hills

Belgium's highest point is the Signal de Botrange at 694 metres above the sea level. Other hills in Belgium include the Kemmelberg (159 m high) and the Koppenberg (77 m high) both known as part of the route of the cycle races Gent–Wevelgem and the Tour of Flanders respectively.

Extreme points

This is a list of the extreme points of Belgium, the points that are farther north, south, east, west, high or low than any other location.
 Northernmost point — Dreef, municipality of Hoogstraten, Antwerp Province
 Southernmost point — Torgny, municipality of Rouvroy, Luxembourg
 Westernmost point — De Panne, West Flanders
 Easternmost point — Krewinkel, municipality of Büllingen, Liège Province
 Highest point — Signal de Botrange (694 m)
 Lowest point — De Moeren (−3 m)

The Belgian National Geographic Institute calculated that the central point of Belgium lies at coordinates , in Nil-Saint-Vincent-Saint-Martin in the municipality of Walhain.

Human geography

Demographics

Political geography

Natural resources
Natural resources in Belgium include construction materials, silica sand and carbonates. Belgium used to have coal mines. As of 2012, the land use was as follows:
 Arable land: 26.49%
 Permanent crops: 0.79%
 Other: 72.72%

As of 2007, the estimated area of irrigated land was of 233.5 km2.

Environment
Because of its high population density and location in the centre of Western Europe, Belgium faces serious environmental problems. A 2003 report suggested that the water in Belgium's rivers was of the lowest quality in Europe, and bottom of the 122 countries studied. The environment is exposed to intense pressures from human activities: urbanisation, dense transportation network, industry, extensive animal breeding, and crop cultivation; air and water pollution also have repercussions for neighbouring countries; uncertainties regarding federal and regional responsibilities (now resolved) have slowed progress in tackling environmental challenges.

Cities

The main cities in Belgium in terms of population are Brussels, Antwerp, Ghent, Charleroi and Liège. Other notable cities include Bruges, Namur, Leuven, Mons and Mechelen.

References

 CIA Factbook
 Belgian Federal Govt Online (accessed Dec. 24, 2006)
 Official statistics of Belgium website (accessed Dec. 24, 2006)

External links 
 Map of Belgium from lib.utexas.edu

 

bn:বেলজিয়াম#ভূগোল